Sir Arthur Sackville Trevor Griffith-Boscawen PC (18 October 1865 – 1 June 1946) was a British politician in the Conservative Party whose career was cut short by losing a string of Parliamentary elections.

Biography
Griffith-Boscawen was born in Trefalyn, Denbighshire, son of Captain Boscawen Trevor Griffith, of the 23rd Welsh Fusiliers who assumed the additional surname of Boscawen in 1875 when his mother died.  He was educated at Rugby School and Queen's College, Oxford.

In 1892 he was elected Member of Parliament for Tonbridge in Kent, a county for which he became JP in 1896. Salisbury, whom he accused of ignoring 90% of MPs, appointed him private secretary to Chancellor of the Exchequer Michael Hicks-Beach in 1895, a job he held before becoming Parliamentary Charity Commissioner in 1900, serving until 1905.  Griffith-Boscawen may have been influential in helping to choose Alfred Milner as the new Governor of Cape Colony. The aged Lord Rosmead was retiring, leaving the government, and Chamberlain in particular desperate to find a replacement. The choice of Milner, a brilliant Oxford scholar, was universally acclaimed in parliament as a shrewd option; the candidate was warmly praised for his courage in coming forward during the Jameson Raid crisis.

Griffith-Boscawen lost his Tonbridge seat in the 1906 general election. He unsuccessfully contested East Denbighshire at a by-election in August that year, and Dudley, Worcestershire at the first general election held in 1910, before being returned for the latter seat later that year. He also sat as a member of the London County Council from 1910 to 1913; he was knighted in 1911.

Griffith-Boscawen had a special interest in working class housing throughout his career. He was a Tariff Reformer who admired Joseph Chamberlain because he became a very influential Conservative even though he was not from an aristocratic background. He carved out a niche for himself as a parliamentary Churchman and strongly opposed moves to disestablish the Welsh Church; following its disestablishment and the end of his parliamentary career, he chaired the Welsh Church Commissioners from 1923 to 1945.

Griffith-Boscawen was commissioned into the part-time 3rd (West Kent Militia) Battalion, Queen's Own (Royal West Kent Regiment), with which he saw embodied service in Malta during the time of the Second Boer War in 1899–1900. The battalion later became the 3rd (Reserve) Battalion, Queen's Own (Royal West Kent Regiment) in the Special Reserve, and he commanded it as Lieutenant-Colonel from 1910. He was mobilised with the battalion at the outbreak of World War I, later commanding a garrison battalion of the Hampshire Regiment at Saint-Omer in France from 1914 to 1916, for which he was mentioned in dispatches.

He was recalled to become Parliamentary Secretary at the Ministry of Pensions in December 1916, then served as Parliamentary Under Secretary of the Board of Agriculture from 1918 to 1921. He was appointed to the Privy Council in the 1920 New Year Honours, entitling him to the style "The Right Honourable".

In 1921 he was appointed to the Lloyd George Coalition Government as Minister of Agriculture but under the law at the time he was required to automatically stand for re-election to the House of Commons.  Griffith-Boscawen lost the ensuing by-election, in part because of Lord Beaverbrook's Canadian Cattle campaign, but another seat was found for him at a by-election in Taunton and he continued his career in government.  Five years later the law on ministerial appointments would be amended to end the requirement for such by-elections.

When Lloyd George's government fell in October 1922, Griffith-Boscawen was one of only a few members of the outgoing Cabinet who agreed to serve under the new Prime Minister, Bonar Law, who promoted him to Minister of Health.  The following month a general election was held and Griffith-Boscawen once more lost his Taunton seat.  He remained in government and set about producing a bill on local government rating which provoked fierce controversy in the country at large.  In March 1923 he sought to re-enter the House of Commons in a by-election at Mitcham, but was defeated by the future Labour Cabinet Minister, James Chuter Ede. Griffith-Boscawen was forced to retire from politics as a result.  The resulting vacancy in the Cabinet was filled by Neville Chamberlain.

Griffith-Boscawen wrote Fourteen Years in Parliament in 1907 and his Memoirs in 1925.  In later life he resided at Pangbourne, Berkshire, and died in London in June 1946 aged 80.

References

Sources

External links 
 

1865 births
1946 deaths
Politicians from Denbighshire
People educated at Rugby School
Alumni of The Queen's College, Oxford
Conservative Party (UK) MPs for English constituencies
Members of London County Council
Members of the Privy Council of the United Kingdom
Agriculture ministers of the United Kingdom
Knights Bachelor
UK MPs 1892–1895
UK MPs 1895–1900
UK MPs 1900–1906
UK MPs 1910–1918
UK MPs 1918–1922
Kent Militia officers
Royal Hampshire Regiment officers
British Army personnel of World War I
Presidents of the Oxford Union